De Swaen is a defunct restaurant in Oisterwijk, Netherlands. The fine dining restaurant was awarded one or two Michelin stars each year in the period 1981–1998. In the period 1984-1991 it was awarded 2 Michelin stars. The restaurant was awarded one star in the periods 1981-1983 and 2002–2003.

Overview
Hotel De Swaen opened in 1978 after a major renovation. Owner Henk Aan de Stegge decided to give the exploitation in the hands of John van Dun and his head chef Cas Spijkers. Soon Spijkers was joined by chef Piet Rutten. In 1980 Van Dun left and Piet Rutten was promoted to director and front of house manager while Spijkers headed the kitchen.

After Spijkers stepped back as head chef, the restaurant lost his star. In 2001 Alan Pearson took over the role as head chef and he managed to win the star back. It was not enough to save the restaurant and it closed in 2004.  In 2006 De Swaen reopened as "Brasserie De Swaen".

Controversy
In 2005, author Ronald Giphart published the book Troost. Giphart claimed that Cas Spijkers and De Swaen were his models for this book. Cas Spijkers was very surprised to hear that he was responsible for the demise of De Swaen, because he left there a few years before they lost their stars.

Star overview
 1981-1983: one star
 1984-1991: two stars
 1992-1998: one star
 1999-2002: no stars
 2003-2004: one star

See also
List of Michelin starred restaurants in the Netherlands

References 

Restaurants in the Netherlands
Michelin Guide starred restaurants in the Netherlands
Defunct restaurants in the Netherlands
De Swaen
De Swaen